Waage is a Norwegian surname. Notable people with the surname include:

Anita Waage (born 1971), Norwegian footballer
Elsa Waage (born 1959), Icelandic opera singer
Geir Waage (born 1967), Norwegian politician
Hilde Waage (born 1959), Norwegian historian
Hjalmar Waage (1892 1939), Norwegian newspaper editor and writer
Hjelm Waage (1866–1947), Norwegian politician
Inger Waage (1923–1995), Norwegian ceramist
Peter Waage (1833–1900), Norwegian chemist
Roy Waage (born 1963), Norwegian politician
Trond Waage (born 1953), Norwegian activist

Norwegian-language surnames